The Adige (or , Átagis) is the second-longest river in Italy, after the Po. It rises near the Reschen Pass in the Vinschgau in the province of South Tyrol, near the Italian border with Austria and Switzerland, and flows  through most of northeastern Italy to the Adriatic Sea.

The name of the river is of unknown origin. Nineteenth-century theories, such as a derivation from the Proto-Celtic , "the water", and alleged to be cognate with the River Tees in England (anciently Athesis, Teesa), have never been accepted by Celtic onomasts, and are now completely obsolete.

Description 
The river source is near the Reschen Pass close to the borders with Austria and Switzerland above the Inn valley. It flows through the artificial alpine Lake Reschen. The lake is known for the church tower that marks the site of the former village of Alt Graun ("Old Graun"); it was evacuated and flooded in 1953 after the dam was finished. Near Glurns, the Rom river joins from the Swiss Val Müstair.

The Adige runs eastward through the Vinschgau to Merano, where it is met by the Passer river from the north. The section between Merano and Bolzano is called Etschtal, meaning Adige Valley. South of Bolzano, the river is joined by the Eisack and turns south through a valley which has always been one of the major routes through the Alps, connecting the Reschen and the Brenner passes, at  considered the easiest of the main Alpine passes.

The Chiusa di Salorno narrows at Salorno mark the southernmost part of the predominantly German-speaking province of South Tyrol. The Adige was mentioned in the "Lied der Deutschen" of 1841 as the southern border of the German language area. As of 2011 62% of Salorno speaks Italian and 37% speaks German. In 1922 Germany adopted the song as its national anthem, although by that time Italy had taken control of all of the Adige.

Near Trento, the Avisio, Noce, and Fersina rivers join. The Adige crosses Trentino and later Veneto, flowing past the town of Rovereto, the Lagarina Valley, the cities of Verona and Adria and the north-eastern part of the Po Plain into the Adriatic Sea. The Adige and the Po run parallel in the river delta without properly joining.

The Adige is connected to Lake Garda by the Mori-Torbole tunnel, an artificial underground canal built for flood prevention.

Tributaries

The following rivers are tributaries to the river Adige (from source to mouth):

Left: Karlinbach, Punibach, Schnalser Bach, Passer, Eisack, Avisio, Fersina, Leno, Alpone
Right: Rambach, Suldenbach, Plima, Falschauer, Noce

Ecology

Fauna 

The Adige is a home to the marble trout (Salmo marmoratus), but at far lower populations than in the past. Fish stocking is one of the most significant causes of the sharp reduction in the original (indigenous) fish population of this subspecies. It will spawn with and interbreed with brown trout, which are regularly stocked in the river and its tributaries.

Gallery

See also
 Leno, one of the main tributaries of the Adige river

References

External links

 Encyclopædia Britannica
 

 
Rivers of South Tyrol
Rivers of the Province of Rovigo
Rivers of the Metropolitan City of Venice
Rivers of the Province of Verona
Rivers of Trentino
Rivers of the Province of Padua
Rivers of the Alps
Rivers of Italy